Wilkes County is the name of two counties in the United States:

 Wilkes County, Georgia
 Wilkes County, North Carolina